The Clan Pt. 2 Guilty (also stylized as The Clan Pt. 2 'GUILTY') is the fourth extended play and the second part of The Clan series by the South Korean boy group Monsta X. It was released by Starship Entertainment and distributed by LOEN Entertainment on October 4, 2016. It also consists of six songs, including the title track "Fighter".

Background and release
In September 2016, the group announced that they would release the second part of The Clan series, revealing the concept as Part 2: GUILTY.

The music video for the title track was released on Starship's and 1theK's official YouTube channels on the same day, directed by the award-winning film director Dee Shin.

The EP was released in two versions; Guilty and Innocent.

Composition
The EP contains the story of protecting their innocence against the world that has caused them loss and pain.

"Fighter" is a song that captures the ears of listeners by expressing explosive youth, particularly, the overwhelming punchline, romantic melody, and direct lyrics intersect without rest, creating a dynamic feeling in the music and performance.

Commercial performance
In 2016, the EP had sold over 100,000 units in South Korea. It also peaked at number two on the weekly Gaon Album Chart. 

The title track "Fighter" debuted at number eight on the Billboard World Digital Song Sales chart upon its release and the song "Be Quiet" debuted at number fourteen in 2021.

Track listing

Charts

Album

Weekly charts

Monthly chart

Year-end chart

Songs

Weekly charts

Sales

Release history

See also
 List of K-pop songs on the Billboard charts
 List of K-pop albums on the Billboard charts
 List of K-pop songs on the World Digital Song Sales chart

References

2016 EPs
Korean-language EPs
Kakao M EPs
Monsta X EPs
Starship Entertainment EPs